Penzhinsky District is an administrative and municipal district (raion) of Koryak Okrug of Kamchatka Krai, Russia, one of the eleven in the krai. It is located in the northwest of the krai. Its administrative center is the rural locality (a selo) of Kamenskoye. Population:  The population of Kamenskoye accounts for 28.0% of the district's total population.

Ethnic composition (2010):
 Koryaks – 44.5%
 Russians – 30.5%
 Evens – 13.7%
 Chukchi – 5.8%
 Ukrainians – 3.1%
 Others – 2.3%

Geography

The Ichigem Range, the northwesternmost range of the Koryak Highlands, rises in the district. Rivers Penzhina, Belaya, Oklan, Esgichninvayam and Zhirovaya are the main rivers flowing through the territory of the district.

References

Notes

Sources

Districts of Kamchatka Krai